Ridwan Sanusi (born 21 September 2002) is a Nigerian professional footballer who plays as a right-winger for FK Pohronie.

Club career

ŠKF Sereď
Sanusi made his professional Fortuna Liga debut for ŠKF Sereď against MFK Tatran Liptovský Mikuláš on 11 September 2021.

References

External links
 
 
 Futbalnet Profile 

2002 births
Living people
Nigerian footballers
Nigerian expatriate footballers
Association football midfielders
ŠKF Sereď players
FK Slavoj Trebišov players
FK Pohronie players
Slovak Super Liga players
Expatriate footballers in Slovakia
Nigerian expatriate sportspeople in Slovakia